Helen Gym (born January 11, 1968) is an American politician. She was the first Asian American woman to serve on the Philadelphia City Council. She was first elected to Council in 2015 and served until 2022, when she resigned to run in the 2023 Philadelphia mayoral election.

A member of the Democratic Party, Gym is a former school teacher and community organizer who cofounded Parents United for Public Education and served on the board of Asian Americans United. While on City Council, she became known as a progressive voice and focused on issues including housing, education, youth issues, and worker’s rights.

Early life
Gym was born in Seattle, Washington, and raised in the suburbs of Columbus, Ohio. Her parents were born in Korea and immigrated to the United States in the 1960s. Her father was a computer engineer who worked for Nationwide Mutual Insurance Company. Her mother worked in the food services department at the Ohio State University. Gym has a younger sister. When Gym was growing up, the family attended the Protestant Korean Church.

In 1993, Gym graduated from the University of Pennsylvania where she majored in history. After leaving college, she returned to Ohio and worked for the Mansfield News Journal as a reporter. In 1994, she worked as a teacher. In 1996, Gym completed her language acquisition master's degree at the University of Pennsylvania.

Early career and activism
Gym has worked as a grassroots community organizer in Philadelphia and has been involved in education reform there since 2006. Around that year, she co-founded the Parents United for Public Education. She is a member of the editorial board of Rethinking Schools and one of the founders of The Philadelphia Public School Notebook, a nonprofit, independent, free news service. She also co-founded a charter school in Chinatown called the Folk Art Cultural Treasures School.

In 2000, Gym led a campaign called the "Stadium Out of Chinatown Coalition" against the construction of a baseball stadium north of Chinatown, due to the fear that it might result in gentrification of the area.

She has also led other campaigns. In 2008, she fought against the establishment of the proposed Foxwoods Casino planned near Philadelphia's Chinatown because of the concern that unchecked development would compel longtime residents of that area to move away. She has also organized in opposition to state-sponsored, predatory gambling.

In 2009, she worked on a successful federal civil rights case to help stop the bullying and harassment of Asian American students in South Philadelphia High School. 
The case came about partially due to a series of assaults at the school on December 3, 2009, when as many as thirty Asian immigrant students were attacked and beaten by large groups of African-American students. In her testimony, she called for the commission to require the school and district officials bear responsibility for not addressing the problem, to differentiate bias-based harassment and generalized violence, and take a different approach for each, and to develop effective anti-harassment policies and procedures.

In 2020, Gym made a cameo on Netflix's Queer Eye to advise a young activist featured on the show.

Philadelphia City Council (2016-2022)
In November 2015, Gym was elected to the Philadelphia City Council as an at-large member. Despite not being endorsed by the Philadelphia Democratic Party, she finished in 5th place out of 16 candidates. Her campaign was supported by labor leader Johnny Dougherty and IBEW Local 98. She ran on a platform of housing reform and education. She said that she was inspired to run in order to ensure that Philadelphia's communities have an equal voice to wealthy entities and lobbyists. She proposed a fair standard of living, especially for schoolchildren, and to combat hunger, lack of housing, and poverty.

In 2016, Gym clashed with the owners of the popular Philadelphia food truck, Wheely Wheely Good. Gym said that the food truck, which is owned by two Asian-Americans, has a name that is "super-racist" and threatened to have them banned from certain events. The owners contend that restaurant's name comes from the fact it is a restaurant on wheels. 

Following the aftermath of the 2017 Unite the Right rally in Charlottesville, Virginia, Gym posted on Twitter, "All around the country, we're fighting to remove the monuments to slavery & racism. Philly, we have work to do. Take the Rizzo statue down", referring to a statue of former Philadelphia mayor, Frank Rizzo. Her efforts to remove both the Frank Rizzo mural and Frank Rizzo statue began in 2016.

As a member of the City Council, Gym supported safe injection sites in Philadelphia. In 2022, Gym opposed the City Council's agreement to reduce wage and business taxes. She also opposed reducing the Business Income and Receipts tax. Gym said the tax money could have been used for the fight against violence.

In response to an increase in violence crime in 2022, Gym proposed more funding for libraries to ensure they would be open year-round for at least six days a week. Gym has argued that libraries are an investment in the youth and can be vital to combating violence. She opposed Mayor Jim Kenney's 2020 budget proposal that would increase police funding by $14 million. Gym supported the Driving Equality Bill in 2022, which prohibits police from pulling over cars for various traffic violations including broken taillights and outdated registrations.

Gym stood by fellow councilmember Bobby Henon, who was indicted for political corruption along with labor leader Johnny Dougherty in 2019. She supported Henon's candidacy for Majority Leader of the Philadelphia City Council.

Controversy
During the trial of Johnny Dougherty, a convicted Philadelphia labor leader, prosecutors alleged that Dougherty bribed members of the Philadelphia City Council with tickets to Philadelphia Eagles games. In 2015, Dougherty told Bobby Henon, a former member of the Philadelphia City Council and convicted felon, to invite Gym, among other members, to the Eagles game. In a wiretapped call, Gym can be heard asking Henon if she should report the tickets as a gift, but Henon implied she did not have to. In 2018, Gym amended her financial interest report to include the ticket.

Gym joined Republican and moderate Democratic members of the City Council to block a bill that would have required pharmaceutical sales representatives to register with the city and have their gifts to doctors be tracked. Philadelphia Magazine speculated that Gym's decisions could have been influenced by the fact her husband Bret Flaherty, is an attorney for AmerisourceBergen, a pharmaceutical company. She was also criticized for not recusing herself from the vote because of a conflict of interest.

2023 Philadelphia mayoral campaign
On November 29th, 2022, Gym resigned from Council in an anticipated run for the Democratic nomination in the 2023 Philadelphia mayoral election. She officially announced her candidacy the next day.

In January 2023, Gym condemned the Union League for gifting Republican Florida Governor Ron DeSantis an award. A week later, Gym was seen at the Union League for a cocktail party. She apologized for attending the cocktail party.

During a forum in February 2023, Gym clashed with the moderator Michael Nutter, the former Mayor of Philadelphia. Nutter criticized Gym for co-founding a charter school in 2005, but while on the City Council opposing the opening of new charter schools in primarily Black neighborhoods. Nutter also accused Gym of self-aggrandizing when she said at a mayoral forum "when I walk into the room, systems of oppression fall and new systems of opportunity come up." Nutter when referring to the quote said: "I literally never heard Martin Luther King, Nelson Mandela, Mother Teresa, Mahatma Gandhi ever say anything like that." Gym shot back at Nutter saying "I’m obviously not taking credit and saying that I’m gonna do all this stuff, but yeah, is that my attitude when I come into a room? Abso-fucking-lutley."

Personal life 
In 1995, she married Bret Flaherty, a lawyer. They have three children.

Awards and honors
Eddy Award, 2007
White House's "César E. Chávez Champions of Change", 2014
The Philadelphia Inquirer's Citizen of the Year
One of Philadelphia Magazine's 75 most influential people in the city
Emily’s List’s 2017 Gabrielle Giffords Rising Star Award

See also
List of members of Philadelphia City Council since 1952

References

External links

TEDx talk "Why The Fight For Public Education Matters"

1960s births
21st-century American politicians
21st-century American women politicians
Asian-American city council members
Asian-American people in Pennsylvania politics
American community activists
American women journalists
American women of Korean descent in politics
Living people
Pennsylvania Democrats
Philadelphia City Council members
Politicians from Columbus, Ohio
Politicians from Seattle
University of Pennsylvania alumni
Women city councillors in Pennsylvania